Solina Nyirahabimana is a Rwandan diplomat and politician who has served as the Minister of State in Charge of Constitution and Legal Affairs since 2020.  She was previously appointed cabinet Minister of Gender and Family Promotion in the Rwandan cabinet on 18 October 2018.

Nyirahabimana served as Rwanda's Ambassador to Switzerland, before she was recalled in 2013.

She represented Rwanda at the third summit of Women7 which occurred at Unesco in Paris in May 2019.

See also
 Germaine Kamayirese
 Espérance Nyirasafari
 Marie-Solange Kayisire

References

External links
 Website of the Rwanda Ministry of Gender and Family Promotion (Migeprof)

Living people
Year of birth missing (living people)
Rwandan women
Rwandan diplomats
Rwandan politicians
Government ministers of Rwanda
Family ministers of Rwanda
Women government ministers of Rwanda
21st-century Rwandan women politicians
21st-century Rwandan politicians